The 2008 Scheldeprijs cycling race took place on April 16, 2008. It was the 96th running of the Scheldeprijs. It was won by Mark Cavendish, who repeated his 2007 win. It was a surprise win as Tom Boonen celebrated too early and Cavendish was able to overtake at the last second.

Results

References

2008
Scheldeprijs
Scheldeprijs